Ruan Sai (born 15 February 2001) is a Chinese footballer currently playing as a midfielder for Guangzhou.

Career statistics

Club
.

References

2001 births
Living people
Chinese footballers
Association football midfielders
Guangzhou F.C. players
Chinese Super League players